Haesselia is a genus of liverworts in the family Cephaloziaceae. It contains the following species (but this list may be incomplete):
 Haesselia roraimensis Grolle & Gradst.

The genus name of Haesselia is in honour of Gabriela Gustava Hässel de Menéndez (1927-2009), who was an Argentinian botanist (Bryology),
who also was a Geologist.

The genus was circumscribed by Riclef Grolle and Stephan Robbert Gradstein in J. Hattori Bot. Lab. vol.64 on page 327 in 1988.

References

Cephaloziaceae
Jungermanniales genera
Taxonomy articles created by Polbot